Pseudarthrobacter defluvii is a bacterium species from the genus Pseudarthrobacter which has been isolated from sewage from the Geumho River near Daegu, Korea. Pseudarthrobacter defluvii has the ability to degrade 4-chlorophenol.

References

Further reading

External links
Type strain of Arthrobacter defluvii at BacDive -  the Bacterial Diversity Metadatabase

Bacteria described in 2008
Micrococcaceae